Héctor Eduardo Corletti (born 14 August 1941) is a retired Argentinian heavyweight boxer. As an amateur he won a silver medal at the 1959 Pan American Games and finished ninth at the 1960 Summer Olympics.  Next year he turned professional and in 1969 won the South American heavyweight title. He retired in 1973 after a series of eight losses.

Boxing career 
Eduardo fought such fighters as 'White Hope' Jerry Quarry, Joe Bugner, George Chuvalo, and Al 'Blue' Lewis. All of these fighters were of a high caliber except Blue Lewis. Eduardo lost to all of these fighters except Chuvalo.

The first of these was a bout against George Chuvalo in 1966. Eduardo won by decision in an upset. This and a victory over Billy Walker gave him a world ranking. Two years later, in 1968, he fought in a losing effort against Blue Lewis. He was billed as English until this loss. In 1970 Eduardo lost to Bugner, and in 1972 was bested by Jerry Quarry. All of these fights went the distance except the Quarry fight, in which Quarry scored a first-round knockout. He also lost in a rematch against Lewis by a knockout in 2 rounds.

References

1941 births
Living people
Olympic boxers of Argentina
Boxers at the 1960 Summer Olympics
Boxers at the 1959 Pan American Games
Pan American Games silver medalists for Argentina
Argentine male boxers
Pan American Games medalists in boxing
Heavyweight boxers
Medalists at the 1959 Pan American Games
People from Quilmes
Sportspeople from Buenos Aires Province